Zhang Shu (1925–1998) was a Chinese diplomat. He was born in Beijing with his ancestral home in Liaocheng, Shandong. He was Ambassador of the People's Republic of China to Belgium (1983–1985) and Japan (1985–1988). He was President of China Foreign Affairs University.

1925 births
1998 deaths
Ambassadors of China to Belgium
Ambassadors of China to Luxembourg
Ambassadors of China to Japan
Presidents of China Foreign Affairs University
National Wuhan University alumni